John T. Lyle (1934–1998) was a professor of landscape architecture at the California State Polytechnic University, Pomona (Cal Poly Pomona); the Lyle Center for Regenerative Studies at Cal Poly Pomona and the Lyle plaza at the entrance to Adam Joseph Lewis Center for Environmental Studies at Oberlin College are named after him.

He is the author of such books as Regenerative Design for Sustainable Development and Design for Human Ecosystems. Lyle was the principal architect for the Lyle Center for Regenerative Studies at Cal Poly Pomona and the principal landscape architect for the Adam Joseph Lewis Center for Environmental Studies at Oberlin College.

References

1934 births
1998 deaths
American architecture writers
California State Polytechnic University, Pomona faculty
20th-century American architects
20th-century American non-fiction writers
20th-century American male writers
American male non-fiction writers